Upasika Kee Nanayon or Kor Khao-suan-luang was a Thai Buddhist upāsikā (devout laywoman) from Ratchaburi (1901 - 1978). After her retirement in 1945, she turned her home into a meditation center with her aunt and uncle. She was mostly self-taught, reading the Pali canon and other Buddhist literature.  Her dhamma talks and poetry were widely circulated. As word of her spread, she became one of the most popular female meditation teachers in Thailand. Many of her talks have been translated into English by Thanissaro Bhikkhu, who sees her as "arguably the foremost woman Dhamma teacher in twentieth-century Thailand".

Publications
Upasika K. Nanayon, An unentangled knowing: lessons in training the mind, Buddhist Publication Society, 1996.
Upasika Kee Nanayon, Thanissaro Bhikkhu, Pure and simple: teachings of a Thai Buddhist laywoman, Somerville, 2005
"Breath Meditation Condensed".

References

1901 births
1978 deaths
Kee Nanayon
Theravada Buddhist spiritual teachers